During the 1945–46 English football season, Brentford competed in the Football League South, due to the cessation of competitive league football for one further season following the end of the Second World War in Europe in May 1945. A return to competitive cup football came in the form of the first FA Cup staged since before the war, with the Bees advancing to the sixth round and equalling the club record.

Season summary

Though the Second World War ended in Europe in May 1945, the first post-war football season would be played in the regionalised wartime format, due to players continuing to be dispersed on service around the world. Brentford again began the season with a shortage of first team players, though full back Bill Gorman would go on to be an ever-present, while centre half Buster Brown, outside forward Idris Hopkins and goalkeeper Joe Crozier would all miss just a handful of games each.

Just two defeats in the opening two Football League South games gave way to a downturn in form, which was not helped by the departure of misfiring former England international forward Les Smith to Aston Villa in October 1945. Pre-war forward Tommy Cheetham also left Griffin Park, so manager Harry Curtis strengthened the attack by re-signing Gerry McAloon from Wolverhampton Wanderers. Further signings came in the form of experienced half backs George Smith and Eric Jones. With excitement hard to come by in league play, Brentford's attention turned to the first FA Cup competition held since the 1938–39 season. Entering in the third round, the Bees battled through to the sixth round, equalling the club record, with Gerry McAloon scoring six goals in the eight matches played. With the return of competitive First Division football looming, a number of amateurs were trialled during the season, with future regulars Alf Jefferies, Frank Latimer and Roddy Munro all going on to sign professional contracts.

Former Brentford wartime guest player Albert Bonass was serving in the Royal Air Force and was killed when his Short Stirling, on a training flight, crashed in the village of Tockwith, North Yorkshire on 9 October 1945.

League table

Results 
Brentford's goal tally listed first.

Legend

Football League South

FA Cup

 Sources: 100 Years Of Brentford, Statto, 11v11

Playing squad 
 Players' ages are as of the opening day of the 1945–46 season.

 Sources: 100 Years Of Brentford, Timeless Bees, Football League Players' Records 1888 to 1939

Coaching staff

Statistics

Appearances and goals

Players listed in italics left the club mid-season.
Source: 100 Years Of Brentford

Goalscorers 

Players listed in italics left the club mid-season.
Source: 100 Years Of Brentford

Wartime international caps

Management

Summary

Transfers & loans 
 Guest players' arrival and departure dates correspond to their first and last appearances of the season.

References 

Brentford F.C. seasons
Brentford